Sophie Letcher (born 29 November 1992) is an Australian tennis player. She started with tennis at the age of three, inspired by her two older brothers and parents, who also played tennis She is the daughter of the late Cliff Letcher, who achieved some success in playing doubles. She competed at the 2011 Australian Open in the women's doubles with Viktorija Rajicic, but lost in the opening round.

ITF Circuit finals

Singles: 1 (0–1)

References

External links
 
 
 

1992 births
Living people
Australian female tennis players
Sportswomen from Victoria (Australia)
Tennis people from the Gold Coast
Sportswomen from Queensland
Tennis players from Melbourne
21st-century Australian women